Ellam Avan Seyal is a 2008 Indian Tamil-language legal thriller film directed by Shaji Kailas. The film features an ensemble cast, including RK, Bhama, Vadivelu, Raghuvaran, Manivannan, Ashish Vidhyarthi, Manoj K. Jayan, and Nassar. It is a remake of the 2006 Malayalam-language film Chinthamani Kolacase. The film released on 28 November 2008.

Vadivelu's dialogue "Kadupethurar My Lord" became famous. Following the moderate success of this film, R.K. went on to collaborate with Kailas for two other films.

Plot
The basic premise is of a lawyer doling out his brand of justice on criminals whom he himself had acquitted from the courts.

The story is centered on Lakshman Krishna alias LK, an enigmatic yet renowned criminal lawyer with an even more enigmatic mission. LK helps out hardened criminals get away from court by lying that there is no proof of their crimes. But later, he pursues and takes them out in a bizarre show of vigilante justice. It was then that the case of Mirchi Girls, a band of spoilt, rich NRI girls, reaches him.

Mirchi Girls are the main people accused in the murder of Chinthamani, their college mate, an innocent girl from a conservative background. Veeramani, Chinthamani's old father, is fighting hard for justice and is represented by Advocate Anbukarasu, a public prosecutor who is famous for his unique style of argument. After a long court battle, LK succeeds in bringing the judgement in favor of Mirchi Girls. He finds out that the people who committed Chinthamani's murder were none other than Anbukarasu and the college principal David Williams. Chinthamani was sent to David's house, but she was locked in a room there and made to have sex with him. Then, Anbukarasu interferes, locks the door, and rapes her all day. Covered in lust, she is killed by them after they rape her for hours. LK, in his own violent way, kills David and Anbukarasu to deliver justice to Chinthamani and Veeramani.

Cast

 R. K. as Laxman Kumar alias LK
 Bhama as Chinthamani, a college girl
 Vadivelu as Vandu Murugan
 Ashish Vidyarthi as Advocate Anbukarasu, the public prosecutor
 Manoj K. Jayan as David Williams, the college principal
 Manivannan as Veeramani, Chinthamani's father
 Raghuvaran as Jagadeeswaran
 Nassar as Inspector Easwarapandian
 Roja as Advocate Jaggubai, LK's associate
 Sukanya as LK's sister
 Visu as LK's uncle
 Sangili Murugan as Chinthamani's uncle
 Lakshmy Ramakrishnan as Olga Mariadas, Chinthamani's caretaker and girls hostel incharge.
 Vijayakumar as Ramakrishnan, LK's late father
 Thalaivasal Vijay as Stranger
 Madhurima Tuli as Madhurima
 Thalapathy Dinesh
 Halwa Vasu as Vandu Murugan's sidekick
 Besant Ravi as Mani
 Vinayakan as Beggar/ Witness 
 Bava Lakshmanan as Vandu Murugan's sidekick
 Mansi Pritam
 Binda
 Leena Mariya Paul
Vijay Ganesh as Mullamandri Muniyandi
 Rachana Maurya (Item number)

Production
Ellam Avan Seyal is the remake of the Malayalam-language film Chinthamani Kolacase, which starred Suresh Gopi and was also directed by Shaji Kailas. The film was also remade in Telugu as Sri Mahalakshmi, with Sri Hari playing the role of Suresh Gopi.

Soundtrack
Songs by Vidyasagar.
"Minmini Kootam" By Sadhana Sargam
"Ada Ada Sema Sema" By Suchitra and Ranjith

Critical reception
Sify noted "The problem with Shaji Kailas's Ellam Avan Seyal a remake of his own Chintamani Kolacase is its non-happening, unbelievable and infantile script which is dark and dreary". Hindu wrote "Depending entirely on a strong story and his narrative skill, Shaji Kailas keeps you quite engrossed with Ellam Avan Seyal". Behindwoods wrote "The script (credited to Shaji Kailas) is taut, but also demands unwavering attention, barring which you might feel that the person is being murdered twice by different people. The movie does not keep you on tenterhooks throughout, which must ideally be the case for a thriller, but it does not bore you too".

References

External links
 

2008 films
Indian vigilante films
Tamil remakes of Malayalam films
2000s Tamil-language films
Films directed by Shaji Kailas